Brian Solis is a digital analyst, speaker and author. He is a principal analyst studying disruptive technology and its impact on business at Altimeter Group, a research firm acquired by global brand management consultancy Prophet in 2015. Solis publishes annual industry reports that track technology and business trends and offer change management direction to companies. 

The author of several books discussing digital marketing, evolving business models, customer experience and brand innovation, Solis shares his research and insights as a frequent keynote speaker at technology, business and creativity events. His work is credited with influencing the early digital and social marketing landscape. Most notably, he is known for developing the Conversation Prism, “a visual map of the social media landscape,” in 2008 and revising/re-releasing it again in 2013.

Career

Early years 
Solis began his career as a programmer and database architect in 1991 at Dodge and Mansfield, a technology-focused advertising and marketing agency in Ventura, California. While at Dodge and Mansfield, he applied his technology skills to the firm’s marketing activities.

As a 23-year-old, Solis published Reality Magazine, a free newsprint publication distributed in the greater Los Angeles area that focused on entertainment, fashion and social issues.

From 1996 to 1999, he held the position of director at The Benjamin Group, a Silicon Valley agency later acquired by Weber Shandwick.

1999 to 2011 
In 1999, Solis started a digital and social media marketing company called FutureWorks. FutureWorks helped startups with digital and traditional marketing programs, often experimenting with new channels and networks, as well as global and national brands like Cisco, Conde Nast, Stella Artois and Swarovski. Ashton Kutcher took an interest in FutureWorks, and his media company Katalyst partnered with FutureWorks in 2009 to work on several early social and digital campaigns for the likes of Oprah Winfrey, the United Nations, Pepsi and the launch of The Cosmopolitan of Las Vegas.

From 2008 to 2010, Solis served as co-founder to BuzzGain, a cloud-based platform for identifying digital influencers and managing influence campaigns . In 2010, BuzzGain was acquired by Meltwater.

In 2011, Solis joined the Altimeter Group as a principal analyst, overseeing research that studies disruptive technology’s impact on business and society.

Conferences and authorship 
Between 2011 and 2014, Solis served, with Mike Edelhart and William Lohse, as executive producer and host of the annual Pivot Conference, an event with speakers addressing digital innovation and business transformation that has been referred to as the “TED of Marketing.” Speakers at Pivot included Counting Crows lead singer Adam Duritz, Al Roker, YouTube CEO Susan Wojcicki, “thinkfluencer” Jeff Jarvis, author Douglas Rushkoff and Deloitte futurist John Hagel.

Solis is often asked to interview celebrities on stage. He interviewed the likes of Anthony Edwards, Jermaine Dupri and Mark Burnett. In 2012 and 2013, he interviewed Smashing Pumpkins frontman Billy Corgan and Shaquille O'Neal at Austin’s popular South by Southwest festival.

Solis has been named one of the “100 Most-Wanted Speakers” at tech conferences, ranked as an “Influential Keynote Speaker,” listed as one of “14 Speakers to Book for Conferences Right Now” and one of “25 Keynote Speakers You Need to Know.

Blogging
Solis’ blog is ranked as a Top 10 Ad Age Power 150 blog. He is also a regular contributor to AdAge, Forbes, The Washington Post and MarketWatch.

During the Fall of 2010, Solis partnered with Landini Media to launch (R)evolution, a YouTube-based series featuring interviews with startup entrepreneurs, investors, business and political leaders, celebrities and innovators. Previous guests include Katie Couric, Adrian Grenier, and Peter Guber.

In 2012, Solis was invited to become a LinkedIn Influencer, joining a highly curated group of leaders, thinkers, and authors on the network’s dedicated publishing channel Pulse.

In 2013, Solis received a Webby Award Honoree for Best Web Personality/Host in the online film and video category.

Publications
Solis authored Engage!: The Complete Guide for Brands and Businesses to Build, Cultivate, and Measure Success in the New Webpublished in 2011, with a foreword by FutureWorks investor Ashton Kutcher.

The End of Business As Usual followed in 2012, with a foreword by broadcast journalist Katie Couric. In 2013, Solis published the book What's the Future of Business: Changing the Way Businesses Create Experiences. 

In 2015, Solis published the book “X: The Experience When Business Meets Design.”  In it, he explained how experiences in human interaction with products defined brands to become the new “social currency.”

As a co-author, Solis has released three books. His first book was co-authored with digital marketer Geoff Livingston, Now is Gone: A Primer on New Media for Executives and Entrepreneurs. Next, he partnered with media expert Dierdre Breakenridge on 2009’s Putting the Public Back in Public Relations: How Social Media Is Reinventing the Aging Business of PR. In 2013, Solis along with Altimeter Group colleague Charlene Li released The Seven Success Factors of Social Business Strategy.

Bibliography
2007: Now is Gone (with Geoff Livingston)
2009: Putting the Public Back in Public Relations (with Deirdre K. Breakenridge)
2011: Engage!: The Complete Guide for Brands and Businesses to Build, Cultivate, and Measure Success in the New Web
2011: The End of Business As Usual
2013: What's the Future of Business: Changing the Way Businesses Create Experiences
2013: The Seven Success Factors of Social Business Strategy (with Charlene Li)
2015: X: The Experience When Business Meets Design
2019: Lifescale : how to live a more creative, productive and happy life

Awards
2008: 40 Under 40 - Silicon Valley Business Journal
2009: 40 Under 40 - PRWeek
2009: Blogger of the Year - PRNews
2009: Marketing Hall of Fame - NYAMA
2010: Influential Leader of the Year - CRM Market Awards (CRM Magazine)
2012: Twitter 140: Music Industry Characters You Need To Follow - Billboard
2012: Who's Who: Leader of the Marketing Industry - BtoB Magazine
2013: Best Web Personality/Host - The Webby Awards
2014: Blogger of the Year - PRNews
2015: Top 20 Mobile Influencers - Mobile FOMO 
2015: The 30 Best People in Advertising to Follow on Twitter - Business Insider 
2015: The Top 10 People to Know in Silicon Valley - Huffington Post 
2015: 25 Keynote Speakers You Need to Know - Inc.

References

External links

The Altimeter Group Bio

1970 births
American bloggers
Businesspeople from California
Living people
Writers from California
American public relations people
American marketing people